Okrągłe  is a village in the administrative district of Gmina Dąbrówno, within Ostróda County, Warmian-Masurian Voivodeship, in northern Poland.

The village has a population of 170.

References

Villages in Ostróda County